The year 1697 in science and technology involved some significant events.

Technology
 August – Peter the Great, Tsar of Russia, studies shipbuilding and other technologies in Holland as part of his incognito Grand Embassy to western Europe.

Organizations
 January – Bernard le Bovier de Fontenelle becomes perpetual secretary of the French Academy of Sciences, in succession to Jean-Baptiste du Hamel.

Publications
 First known publication of English physician Richard Boulton, A Treatise of the Reason of Muscular Motion.
 William Dampier publishes A New Voyage Round the World in London.

Births
 February 24 – Bernhard Siegfried Weiss, later known as Albinus, German-born Dutch anatomist (died 1770)
 February 5 – William Smellie, Scottish obstetrician (died 1763)
 September 23 – Andrew Plummer, Scottish physician and chemist (died 1756)

Deaths
 January 26 – Georg Mohr, Danish mathematician (born 1640)
 March 1 – Francesco Redi, Tuscan physician and biologist (born 1626)
 Late October – Constantijn Huygens, Dutch statesman and telescope maker (born 1628)
 December 9 – Scipion Abeille, French surgeon and poet
 Probable year – Gilbert Clerke, English mathematician, natural philosopher and theologian (born 1626)
 Ann Baynard, English natural philosopher  (died 1672)

 
17th century in science
1690s in science